A list of windmills in the German state of Mecklenburg-Vorpommern.

References

Windmills
Mecklenburg-Vorpommern
Win
Windmills